The 1937–38 international cricket season was from September 1937 to April 1938. The season consists several first-class international tours.

Season overview

November

New Zealand in Australia

England in India

December

England in Argentina

References

International cricket competitions by season
1937 in cricket
1938 in cricket